National Identities is an peer reviewed, academic journal on the topic of national and ethnic identity.   It is published five times a year by Taylor & Francis.  The journal was founded by Pippa Catterall (of the University of Westminster). In addition to Catterall, the current editors are David Kaplan (Kent State University), Samir Pandya (University of Westminster), and Elfie Rembold (Berlin).

Aim 
In the journal's inaugural issue, the editors described National Identities as a "forum" for discussion of "competing sources of identity, whether regional, tribal, religious or political.."  and stated that "the prime unit of analysis" would be identity, "how it is expressed and mediated, and how it relates to the state and the problematic construction of the nation."   According to David Kaplan, one of the journal's four editors and the journal's anchor editor, the goal of the journal is to "fill in some of those holes that were there between those different types of journals dealing with ethnicity on one hand and nations and nationalism on the other."

The Bibliographical Bulletin on Federalism describes National Identities as part of the trend towards globalization, which led to a, "growing interest in national identities."

Abstracting and Indexing 

According to Taylor & Francis, "National Identities is currently abstracted and indexed in British Humanities Index; CSA Worldwide Political Science Abstracts; Historical Abstracts; Index Islamicus; International Bibliography of the Social Sciences (IBSS); OCLC; Political Science and Government Abstracts; SCOPUS; Social Services Abstracts; Sociological Abstracts and Social Planning/ Policy and Development Abstracts."

See also 

 Nations and Nationalism

References

External links
 Journal web site

English-language journals
Political science journals
Publications established in 1999
Quarterly journals
Taylor & Francis academic journals
National identity
Ethnic studies